Henry "Two-Bits" Homan (June 7, 1898May 11, 1953) was a professional American football player. Homan was a college stand-out at Lebanon Valley College where he played quarterback and graduated in 1924. He gained his nickname of "Two Bits" due to his size. Standing at 5′5″ and weighing in at an average 150 lbs throughout his playing day, Homan was one of the smallest players ever in the National Football League.

Homan joined the NFL in 1925 with the Frankford Yellow Jackets and played his whole career with them until 1930. Though one of the lesser known NFL players, he was one of the most popular Yellow Jacket players. The Yellow Jackets, with Homan, would go on to win the 1926 NFL Championship.

Homan also played football with the independent Millville Football & Athletic Club, a professional football team based in New Jersey in 1925. The team won the mythical "Pro Football Championship of New Jersey" that year. In January 1926, Homan and several other members of the Millville Big Blue, traveled to Florida to play a series of exhibition games. They formed a team called the Haven-Villa of Winter Haven played against Jim Thorpe and his Tampa Cardinals. The team left Florida with a 5-0-1 record.

He was elected into the Lebanon Valley College Athletic Hall of Fame in 1976.

Season Stats
(Record of NFL play only)

References

External links
Millville Football & Athletic Club PFRA
Ghosts of the Gridiron: The Frankford Yellow Jackets

1898 births
1953 deaths
Sportspeople from Reading, Pennsylvania
American football quarterbacks
American football safeties
Players of American football from Pennsylvania
Homan, Henry
Millville Football & Athletic Club players
Homan, Henry
Burials in Pennsylvania